This is a list of episodes from the first season of Happy Days.

The pilot for the series was aired on February 25, 1972, as part of an episode of Love, American Style in a segment titled "Love and the Television Set".  For syndication reruns, this was retitled "Love and the Happy Days." The role of sister Joanie was played by 12-year-old Susan Neher. Father Howard was played by Harold Gould, and brother Chuck (Charles) was played by Ric Carrott.

The story opens with the Cunninghams buying their first television set, an expensive novelty in the 1950s. Potsie convinces Richie to use that as an enticement to get a girl to agree to a date, which he does but in the end Richie gets crushed. His father uses his wisdom of experience to console him. Howard is so entranced by his new TV that he sits alone in the living room watching nothing but a test pattern and tone.

Main cast
 Ron Howard as Richie Cunningham
 Marion Ross as Marion Cunningham
 Anson Williams as Warren "Potsie" Weber
 Tom Bosley as Howard Cunningham

Guest stars
 Don Most as Ralph Malph
 Henry Winkler as Arthur "Fonzie" Fonzarelli
 Erin Moran as Joanie Cunningham
 Gavan O'Herlihy as Chuck Cunningham
 Beatrice Colen as Marsha Simms
Neil J. Schwartz as "Bag" Zombroski

Broadcast history
The season aired Tuesdays at 8:00-8:30 pm (EST).

Episodes

Consisted of 16 episodes airing on ABC.
Recurring Character Debuts: Richie Cunningham, Marion Cunningham, Potsie Weber, Howard Cunningham, Joanie Cunningham, Ralph Malph, Arthur Fonzarelli.
This was the first of two seasons to have Rock Around the Clock as the show's original theme song.

References

Happy Days 01
1974 American television seasons